Ala Al Hilwa Wa Al Morra (Arabic: على الحلوة والمرة), alternatively captioned as A Sweet And Bitter,  is a Lebanese romantic drama television series based on adaptation of Turkish drama series İyi Günde Kötü Günde. Produced by MBC Studios and O3 Medya, it stars with Dana Mardini, Nicolas Mouawad, Pamela El Kik and Joe Trade as main characters. The story revolved around Farah, a wedding planner, was abandoned during wedding ceremony by her fiancé Rayan, and he returned five years later. Rayan reprehensibly married to another woman called Lana. In the relationship, he begins a hesitant approach to Farah in order to win her back. The series was aired on MBC 1 at 10pm KSA from 29 August to 16 November 2021. Episodes were directly released at Shahid VIP streaming service.

Synopsis
Farah (Dana Mardini) devastated after crucial wedding ceremony while she prepared to marry  Rayan (Nicolas Mouawad), who spontaneously left the event due to conflict with her father. He returned after five years and married to another woman called Lana (Pamela El Kik). This, however, leads more to struggle to win Farah back, when she engaged with Wissem (Joe Trad). Lana secretly have affair with other man, Rayan didn't notice her connection. Lana and Rayan reluctantly set wedding ceremony, but abrupted by a scuffle between Lana's actual father and her mother newly engaged fiancé in the ceremony.

Rayan faces more confrontation to Wissem, who later became psychotic. In the remaining episode, Wissem kidnapped Farah and relocated her to different houses as a result of police searching. In the final scene, Wissem hands over Farah to Rayan.

Series overview

Cast and characters

References

External links
 

2021 television series debuts
2021 television series endings
Lebanese television series
2020s in Lebanese television
Arabic-language television
Melodrama television series
Television series about couples
Romantic drama television series
Television shows set in Istanbul
Television shows set in Lebanon